The AMJ Campbell Shorty Jenkins Classic (formerly known as the M&M Meat Shops Shorty Jenkins Classic, CIBC Trust Shorty Jenkins Classic and just the Shorty Jenkins Classic) is an annual curling tournament, held in September at the Cornwall Curling Centre in Cornwall, Ontario and sponsored by AMJ Campbell Van Lines. It is one of the first curling tournaments of the World Curling Tour season. The tournament is held in honour of the famous ice-maker, Shorty Jenkins. The total purse for the men's event is $59,000 and $29,500 for the women's. The event was held in Brockville, Ontario until 2015 when it was moved down the Saint Lawrence to Cornwall.

The event was created in 1996 by Jenkins and Gord McCrady to "repay the Brockville Country Club for funds used to buy a new compressor, chiller and condenser." The following year a women's event was added.

The Shorty Jenkins Classic scheduled for September 2020 was cancelled due to the COVID-19 pandemic.

Past champions

Men

Women

Notes

References

External links

 
Recurring sporting events established in 1996
1996 establishments in Ontario
Curling in Ontario
Sport in Cornwall, Ontario